The Denmark men's national field hockey team represents Denmark in men's international field hockey and is controlled by the Danish Hockey Union, the governing body for field hockey in Denmark.

Denmark has participated in five Olympic Games and has won one silver medal, in 1920. They have never qualified for the World Cup, but they have participated in two European Championships.

Competitive record

Summer Olympics

European championships

References

European men's national field hockey teams
Field hockey
National team
Men's sport in Denmark
da:Danmarks hockeylandshold